The 4th Goya Awards were presented in Madrid, Spain on 10 March 1990.

Twisted Obsession won the award for Best Film.

Winners and nominees

Major award nominees

Other award nominees

Honorary Goya

Victoriano López García

References

External links
Official website (Spanish)
IMDb profile

04
1989 film awards
1989 in Spanish cinema